The following are the national records in athletics in Angola maintained by its national athletics federation: Federacao Angolana de Atletismo (FAA).

Outdoor

Key to tables:
    

h = hand timing

Men

Women

Indoor
FAA does not keep official records in indoor events.

Men

Women

References
General
Angolan Records - Men Outdoor 12 August 2014 updated
Angolan Records - Women Outdoor  29 June 2019 updated
World Athletics Statistic Handbook 2018: National Indoor Records
Specific

External links
FAA web site

Angola
Athletics
Records
Athletics